Anthony McDonald (born 17 March 2001) is a Cypriot born Scottish footballer who plays for Highland League club Brechin City. He has previously played for Heart of Midlothian, Inverness Caledonian Thistle, Dunfermline Athletic, Córdoba CF and Edinburgh City.

Early life
McDonald was born in Limassol and raised in Kirkaldy.

Career

Heart of Midlothian 
He made his first team debut for Hearts, aged 16, on 12 December 2017, playing from the start in a 2–0 win against Dundee at Tynecastle Park. McDonald provided the assist for the opening goal.

He joined Hearts at under-14 level from Livingston. He was a member of the Scotland under-16 Victory Shield squad.

Inverness Caledonian Thistle (Loan) 
McDonald moved on loan to Inverness Caledonian Thistle in January 2019. While with Inverness he scored his first ever professional goal, in a 2–2 draw against Greenock Morton.

Dunfermline Athletic (Loan) 
McDonald moved on loan to Dunfermline Athletic with fellow Hearts youngster, Harry Cochrane, on 30 August 2019. Following a lengthy time out with injuries, McDonald made his Dunfermline debut from the bench on 21 December 2019 in a 2–0 loss to his former club, Inverness Caledonian Thistle.

Córdoba

On 5 October 2020, McDonald signed for Spanish club Córdoba CF, on a two-year deal.

Inverness Caledonian Thistle

McDonald returned to Scotland in February 2021 to sign with Inverness Caledonian Thistle on a deal until the end of the season.

On 5 May 2021, McDonald signed a new deal with Inverness Caledonian Thistle. He left the club upon expiry of his contract on 7 January 2022.

Edinburgh City

On 7 January 2022, upon the expiration of his contract at Inverness, McDonald immediately joined Scottish League Two side Edinburgh City.

Brechin City 
In August 2022, McDonald moved from Edinburgh City, now F.C. Edinburgh, to Highland League side, Brechin City.

Career statistics

References

2001 births
Living people
Scottish footballers
Association football midfielders
Heart of Midlothian F.C. players
Scottish Professional Football League players
Livingston F.C. players
Inverness Caledonian Thistle F.C. players
F.C. Edinburgh players
21st-century Scottish people
Brechin City F.C. players
People from Limassol